Scripps Ranch High School (SRHS) is a public school located in northeast San Diego, California, United States, that serves the Scripps Ranch community as well as students participating in the Voluntary Enrollment Exchange Program (VEEP) busing program of the San Diego Unified School District.

Students
The average class size is 36. SRHS accepts students from Thurgood Marshall Middle School, choiced-in Wangenheim Middle School, and VEEP students. There are 2,157 students enrolled in the 2019-2020 school year.

Diversity
The ethnic breakdown as of 2018-19 is 40.1% White, 24.7% Asian, 14.5% Hispanic, 2.7% African American, 11.6% "Two or More Races", 0.4% Pacific Islander, 0.1% American Indian or Alaska Native, and 0.1% Not Reported.

Student Accomplishments
Past student accomplishments include an Intel International Science and Engineering Fair award winner, National Merit Scholarship winner, 102 AP Scholars, and one Jeopardy! contestant.

Athletics

Seasonal sports
Fall: cross country, field hockey, American football, marching band & color guard, women's tennis, women's golf, women's volleyball, men's water polo
Winter: roller hockey, men's basketball, women's basketball, men's soccer, women's soccer, women's water polo, wrestling
Spring: badminton, baseball, golf, men's tennis, softball, swimming and diving, men's lacrosse, women's lacrosse, track, men's volleyball
Non-seasonal: cheerleading, dance team

Its rival schools are the Mira Mesa High School Marauders, Poway High School Titans and Cathedral Catholic High School Dons.

List of CIF championships

Academics

Standardized test scores
For 2012, the base API score was 900, growing from a score of 883. Based on the 2011 API results, Scripps Ranch was a top performing comprehensive high school in the San Diego Unified School District, and the highest performing comprehensive high school in San Diego County, surpassing several fellow schools.

Advanced Placement and honors
SRHS offers a variety of AP as well as honors classes in the sciences, world languages, arts, social studies and English. AP and honors classes are weighted on a 5-point scale.

Language programs
SRHS offers several language programs including Spanish, American Sign Language (ASL), and Japanese. AP level classes are available for Spanish. Honors is available for fourth year Japanese. The world language program has a blog showing the central information and events going on in SRHS language department. All classes are available for 2-year study or more.

College attendance
95% of students attend some form of post-secondary school education. More specifically, according to the school principal, "60% of our students will be attending a 4-year university, 35% are going to a 2-year college and 5% will be serving their country in the military or pursuing other post high school options."

Media
Scripps Ranch High School's student-produced newspaper is the Falcon Flyer and its yearbook is known as the Legend. It also has a number of other limited release publications such its award-winning yearly literary magazine, The Ascent. Scripps Ranch High School also has a weekly video broadcast for telling about school events, known as the Falcon Five Broadcast.

Controversies

SRHS "Twerk Team" 
In mid 2013, 33 students were suspended after a video show students Twerking was uploaded to YouTube (Original video has since been taken down). The students originally had their senior prom and graduation walking rights taken away from them as part of the suspension. Public outcry quickly followed the news of the student suspensions with the hashtag #FreeTheTwerkTeam

Valedictorian speech
In 2015, the administration came under fire after the valedictorian was denied the right to speak at graduation for the Class of 2015. The decision resulted from an 18-year-old policy in which "all interested students audition for the right to be one of the commencement speakers - even the valedictorian", as reported by NBC. The issue resulted in students putting together an online petition which gathered over 700 signatures asserting that she should be allowed to address her classmates as literally defined in the word "valedictorian".

AP Test Scores Cancellation
On June 30, 2017, school officials announced that due to seating violations, 540 students from Scripps Ranch need to retake their Advanced Placement exams in AP Calculus, AP Biology, AP United States History and five other subjects. A total of 800 exams had been cancelled because of the test administrators' failure to ensure proper distance between students as ordained by the College Board. Hundreds of students and parents have filed complaints toward San Diego Unified, and the school board voted on July 6 to file a temporary restraining order on the College Board's decision.

Notable alumni
Nicole Ahsinger. Represented the United States in the 2016 and 2020 Olympic Games in trampoline gymnastics (Class of 2016)
Adam Brody. Actor
 Kyle Mooney. Saturday Night Live cast member (Class of 2003)
Keely Moy. Professional ice hockey player for the ladies HC Lugano of the Switzerland women's ice hockey league. She represented Switzerland in 2022 Olympic Games in Women's Ice Hockey.   
Tyler Moy. Professional ice hockey player for Genève-Servette HC of the Swiss National League (NL).
Chad Ruhwedel. Professional ice hockey player in the National Hockey League as a defenseman for the Pittsburgh Penguins and Buffalo Sabres
Xander Schauffele. Professional golfer, winner of 2017 Tour Championship
Sam Staab. National Women's Soccer League defender for the Washington Spirit
Marni von Wilpert. Member of the San Diego City Council
Kellen Winslow II. Former National Football League tight end

References

External links
School website

Educational institutions established in 1993
High schools in San Diego
Public high schools in California
1993 establishments in California